was a Japanese professional baseball catcher. He played in Nippon Professional Baseball for the Orions franchise.

Daigo was born in Kita, Tokyo, on 15 November 1938. As a high school baseball player, he participated in the Kōshien tournaments alongside batterymate Sadaharu Oh in 1956. When Daigo made his Nippon Professional Baseball debut in 1957, his team was called the Mainichi Orions. Upon his retirement as a player in 1975, the team had become known as the Lotte Orions. Daigo was a career .234/.275/.324 hitter, and not known for power. After he retired as a player, Daigo became a coach for the Orions/Marines. He died in Tokyo of acute myeloid leukemia on 11 December 2019, aged 81.

References

External links

1938 births
2019 deaths
Baseball people from Tokyo
Deaths from cancer in Japan
Nippon Professional Baseball catchers
Japanese baseball players
Daimai Orions players
Lotte Orions players
Mainichi Orions players
Tokyo Orions players
Deaths from acute myeloid leukemia
Japanese baseball coaches